Stina is a feminine given name, common in the Nordic countries, and may refer to:

Stina Aronson (1892–1956), Swedish writer
Stina Berg (1869–1930), Swedish actress
Stina Bergman (1888–1976), Swedish writer, translator, and screenwriter
Stina Bergström (born 1958), Swedish politician
Stina Blackstenius (born 1996), Swedish association football player
Stina Lykke Borg (born 1986), Danish football goalkeeper
Stina Lundberg Dabrowski (born 1950), Swedish journalist, television host, producer and writer
Stina Cronholm (born 1936), Swedish hurdler and pentathlete 
Stina Ehrensvärd (born 1967), Swedish entrepreneur and industrial designer
Stina Ekblad (born 1953), Swedish-speaking Finnish actress
Stina Lovisa Estberg (born 1998), Swedish artistic gymnast
Stina Gardell (born 1990), Swedish medley swimmer
Stina Grenholm, Swedish ski-orienteer
Stina Haage (1924–2017), Swedish gymnast
Stina Hedberg (1887–1981), Swedish actress
Stina Högkvist (born 1972), Swedish art curator and an art historian
Stina Karlsson (born 1961), Swedish cross-country skier
Stina Leicht (born 1972), American science fiction and fantasy fiction author
Stina Mårtensson (1882–1962), Swedish missionary
Stina Martini (born 1993), Austrian skater
Stina Nilsson (born 1993), Swedish biathlete and cross-country skier
Stina Nordenstam (born 1969), Swedish singer, songwriter and musician
Stina Oscarson (born 1975), Swedish theatre director, author, and debater
Stina Piper (1734–1800), Swedish freight manager and countess
Stina Quint (1859–1924), Swedish educator, children's newspaper editor, suffragette, and feminist
Stina Rautelin (born 1963), Swedish-speaking Finnish actress
Stina Robson, (formally known as Inga-Stina Robson, Baroness Robson of Kiddington; 1919–1999), Swedish-British political activist
Stina Segerström (born 1982), Swedish footballer
Stina Ståhle (1907–1971), Swedish actress
Stina Svensson (born 1970), Swedish politician
Stina Torjesen, Norwegian scientist
Stina Troest (born 1994), Danish hurdler
Stina Viktorsson (born 1985), Swedish curler
Stina Wirsén (born 1968), Swedish illustrator
Stina Wollter (born 1964), Swedish radio host and artist
Stina Heks, a character in the teen novel series Keeper of the Lost Cities by Shannon Messenger

See also
Stina Rock, rock formation of the South Georgia and the South Sandwich Islands
Swedish Translators in North America (STiNA)

Feminine given names
Swedish feminine given names